The 2023 Idemitsu FIM Asia Road Racing Championship was the 28th season of the Asia Road Racing Championship. The season started on 24 March at Chang International Circuit in Thailand and ended on 3 December back at Chang International Circuit.

Calendar and results

Calendar changes
 Zhuhai International Circuit will host an ARRC round for the first time since 2019, after a failed attempt in 2022 due to COVID-19 restrictions in China.

 On 12 January 2023, it was announced that Mandalika International Street Circuit will host the 4th round of the season, making it the first time the circuit will host an ARRC round.

Teams and riders

All teams use series-specified Dunlop tyres.

Championship standings

Asia Superbike 1000

|valign="top"|

<span style="font-size: 85%">Bold – Pole positionItalics – Fastest lap
|}

Supersports 600

Bold – Pole positionItalics – Fastest lap

Asia Production 250

Bold – Pole positionItalics – Fastest lap

Underbone 150

Bold – Pole positionItalics – Fastest lap

References

External links
 

Asia Road Racing Championship
Asia Road Racing Championship seasons
Asia Road Racing Championship